Nyctiphanes is a genus of krill, comprising four species with an anti-tropical distribution. Based on molecular phylogenetic analyses of the cytochrome oxidase gene and 16S ribosomal DNA, Nyctiphanes is believed to have evolved during the Miocene.

References

Krill
Crustacean genera
Taxa named by Georg Ossian Sars